The CCGS Shark was a research vessel employed by the Canadian Coast Guard.
She was employed on the North American Great Lakes. Shark was built by Hike Metals & Shipbuilbing Limited of Wheatley, Ontario. She was a converted tugboat commissioned into the Coast Guard in 1971. 

She was retired in late 2009 and sold as surplus April 2011 for $160,000

See also

 CCGS Kelso - Shark's replacement

References

External links

 

Ships of the Canadian Coast Guard